The following table indicates the party of elected officials in the U.S. state of North Carolina:
Governor
Lieutenant Governor
Secretary of State
Attorney General
Auditor
Treasurer
Superintendent of Public Instruction
Commissioner of Agriculture
Commissioner of Labor
Commissioner of Insurance

The table also indicates the historical party composition in the:
State Senate
State House of Representatives
State delegation to the U.S. Senate
State delegation to the U.S. House of Representatives
For years in which a presidential election was held, the table indicates which party's nominees received the state's electoral votes. Bold indicates present office holders.

1776–1867

1868–present

See also
Politics of North Carolina
Elections in North Carolina

References

External links 
Political Graveyard.com, NC Offices

Politics of North Carolina
Government of North Carolina
North Carolina